Arthur Sutherland Pigott Woodhouse (1895–1964) was a Canadian professor of English at the University of Toronto, a leading authority on the works and times of the English Poet John Milton.

Biography
Woodhouse was born in Port Hope, Ontario 27 September 1895. As a boy he spent 10 years in England, before returning to Ontario and completed his secondary education at the Collegiate Institute, Barrie. He attended University of Toronto and graduated with a B.A. in 1919. He was a Townsend Scholar at Harvard Graduate School and graduated with an A.M. in 1922. Although he studied for a doctorate, due to teaching commitments and a lack of interest in some of the modules he failed to obtain one from Harvard.

Woodhouse spent five years at the Department of English at the University of Manitoba where he taught eighteenth-century literature, the literature of Milton, Victorian Thought and the History of Criticism. In 1944 he joined the University of Toronto as head of both the college and the graduate departments. He edited The University of Toronto Quarterly for 13 years. He died on 31 October 1964.

Woodhouse was a leading authority on the work and times of the English Poet John Milton. He received many honours, including a Guggenheim Fellowship in 1942 and an honorary Dr. Litt. from Acadia University in 1948.

Bibliography
Woodhose published two books:
, foreword by A.D. Lindsay.

Other publications include:

See also:

References

Further reading

External links 

 A. S. P. Woodhouse archival papers held at the University of Toronto Archives and Records Management Services

University of Toronto alumni
Academic staff of the University of Toronto
Academic staff of the University of Manitoba
Harvard Graduate School of Arts and Sciences alumni
Canadian academics of English literature
1895 births
1964 deaths